Bill R. Newton (born December 22, 1950) is an American retired power forward–center who played two seasons in the American Basketball Association (NBA) as a member of the Indiana Pacers during the 1972–73 and 1973–74 seasons. Born in Rockville, Indiana, he attended Louisiana State University.

While at Louisiana State, he amassed 1,339 career points & 802 career rebounds. He finished his career as the school's 4th all-time leading rebounder.  While at LSU, he helped lead them to the 1970 NIT Final Four, was a 2-time ALL-$EC selection and team captain & MVP his senior year (1971–72).  He participated in 1972 U.S. Olympic trials and selected as an alternate.  He was named to LSU's 1970s All-Decade Team.

He played for coach Press Maravich.

In 2013, he was inducted into the Indiana Basketball Hall of Fame   He attended Rockville, Indiana High School, leading the Rox to a record of 19-3 and a Wabash River Conference title his senior season (1967–68).  He led the state of Indiana in rebounding (22.0 rbs/game) his senior season.

References

External links

1950 births
Living people
American men's basketball players
Basketball players from Indiana
Centers (basketball)
Indiana Pacers players
LSU Tigers basketball players
People from Rockville, Indiana
Power forwards (basketball)